Bahia Principe Hotels & Resorts is a division of resorts owned by Grupo Piñero, established in 1995 with the opening its first hotel in the town of Rio San Juan on the northern coast of the Dominican Republic.

The company currently maintains a total of 27 hotels & resorts in: Palma de Mallorca and Tenerife (Spain); Riviera Maya (Mexico); Samaná, La Romana, Punta Cana, and Río San Juan (Dominican Republic); and Runaway Bay(Jamaica).  It also keeps travel and tour offices in Argentina, Miami, Florida, Portugal, and Russia.

The resort participates in the UN Initiative for  business sustainability. Grupo Piñero releases an annual sustainability report with the results of CSR implementation into the resort's agenda.

References 

Hotels established in 1995
Hotel chains in Spain
Hotels in Jamaica
Hotels in Mexico
Hotels in Spain
Hotels in the Dominican Republic
Hospitality companies of Spain